Pain Moallem Kola (also Romanized as Pā’īn Mo‘allem Kolā; also known as Mo‘allem Kolāyeh) is a village in Miandorud-e Kuchak Rural District, in the Central District of Sari County, Mazandaran Province, Iran. At the 2006 census, its population was 693, in 184 families.

References 

Populated places in Sari County